Kelantan Football Association (Malay: Persatuan Bola Sepak Kelantan), is a professional football association based in Kota Bharu in the Malaysian state of Kelantan. The team had their first major success in the 2012 season when they won the League championship, Piala FA and Piala Malaysia. Domestically, Kelantan have won the Liga Super Championship on 2 occasions, most recently in the 2012 season, 2 Piala Malaysia, 2 Piala FA, 1 Piala Sumbangsih and 1 Liga Premier title. 2012 was their debut playing in the AFC Cup. They played well in the group stage to gain first place. However, the team lost in the quarter final to Erbil SC. Kelantan FA were the only team which won the Piala Emas Raja-Raja for the thirteen times.

Kelantan team became a symbol of unity of the people of Kelantan. It can be seen during the match when various background Kelantan fans come to the stadium to support their team. Kelantan team revival began when Annuar Musa took over the president post during 2009 season. Since then, Kelantan team has become among the respected team in the Malaysian football.

Honours

Domestic

League
Division 1/ Liga Super
 Winners (2): 2011, 2012
 Runners-up : 2010
Division 2/ Liga Premier
 Winners : 2000
Division 3/ Liga FAM
 Winners (3): 1953*, 1954, 2005 (* shared)
 Runners-up : 1963, 1971, 1972

Cups
Piala Malaysia
 Winners (2): 2010, 2012
 Runners-up : 1955, 1970, 2009, 2013
Piala FA
 Winners (2): 2012, 2013
 Runners-up : 2009, 2011, 2015
Piala Sumbangsih
 Winners : 2011
 Runners-up : 2012, 2013

Asian
AFC Cup: 3 appearances
 2012: Quarter-finals (lost 2–6 on aggregate to Arbil)
 2013: Round of 16 (lost 0–2 to Kitchee)
 2014: Group stage (4th position)

Treble
 "Treble Winner" (Liga Super, Piala FA and Piala Malaysia): 1
 2012

U21 Team
Piala Presiden
 Winners (7): 1985, 1995, 2005, 2011, 2013, 2015, 2016
 Runners-up : 1988, 2003, 2006–07

U19 Team
Piala Belia
 Winners (2): 2008, 2014
 Runners-up : 2013

Record of success

League history
 1998–2000: Liga Perdana 2 (2)
 2001–2003: Liga Perdana 1 (1)
 2004: Liga Premier (2)
 2005: Liga FAM (3)
 2006–2008: Liga Premier (2)
 2009–: Liga Super (1)

League records

Remarks:

Player records

(2008–present)

Appearances
 Most appearances in total (League & Cup) – 356 Mohd Badhri Mohd Radzi (2008–)
 Most League appearances – 219 Mohd Badhri Mohd Radzi (2008–)

Goalscoring
 Leading Goalscorer (League & Cup) – 95 Mohd Badhri Mohd Radzi (2008–)
 Leading Goalscorer (League only) – 55 Mohd Badhri Mohd Radzi (2008–)
 Leading Goalscorer (Piala FA) – 
 Leading Goalscorer (Piala Malaysia) – 22 Indra Putra Mahayuddin (2009–2010, 2012–2013, 2016–)
 Leading Goalscorer (AFC Cup) – 7 Mohammed Ghaddar (2012), Mohd Badhri Mohd Radzi (2012–2014)

Top goalscorer by years

Team records
(2009–present)

Matches

Record wins
 Record League win: 6–0 v FELDA United, Liga Super, 9 April 2011, 6–0 v Perak, Liga Super, 7 July 2012
 Record Piala FA win: 5–1 v PDRM, Second Round 1st leg, 21 February 2009, 1–5 v Selangor, Semi-Final 1st leg, 30 March 2011
 Record Piala Malaysia win: 6–1 v Terengganu, Group Stage, 14 September 2012, 6–1 v Johor Darul Ta'zim, Quarter-Final 2nd leg, 4 October 2013
 Record AFC Cup win: 5–0 v SHB Đà Nẵng, Group Stage, 2 April 2013
 Record home win: 6–0 v FELDA United, Liga Super, 9 April 2011, 6–0 v Perak, Liga Super, 7 July 2012
 Record away win: 1–6 v Terengganu, Liga Super, 15 July 2016

Record defeats
 Record League defeat: 5–3 v Pahang, Liga Super, 12 August 2015
 Record FA Cup defeat: 4–2 v Terengganu, Semi-Final 2nd leg, 28 May 2013
 Record Malaysia Cup defeat: 4–2 v Johor Darul Ta'zim, Quarter-Final 1st leg, 28 September 2013, 1–4 v Selangor, Group Stage, 12 August 2016
 Record AFC Cup defeat: 1–6 v Maziya, Group Stage, 23 April 2013
 Record home defeat: 2–5 v Selangor, Liga Super, 21 May 2016
 Record away defeat: 1–6 v Maziya, Group Stage, 23 April 2013

Sequences
 Longest sequence of League wins: 6 (6 January 2009 – 17 February 2009)
 Longest sequence of League defeats: 5 (2 May 2009 – 23 May 2009)
 Longest sequence of League draws: 3 (15 January 2013 – 22 January 2013)
 Longest unbeaten run: 22 (23 January 2010 – 3 August 2010)
 Longest run without a win: 6 (11 April 2009 – 23 May 2009), (21 February 2015 – 18 April 2015)
 Longest run without a draw: 15 (22 March 2014 – 25 June 2014)
 Longest successive scoring run: 10 (11 February 2012 – 12 May 2012)
 Longest successive non-scoring run: 3 (19 January 2013 – 16 February 2013)
 Longest run without a clean sheet: 16 (6 January 2009 – 23 May 2009)
 Longest run of clean sheets: 6 (22 April 2011 – 10 May 2011) achieved by Khairul Fahmi Che Mat

Updated: 8 March 2017

Foreign players

Notes: 2009-2011: foreign players banned.
 Foreign players who left the club during mid season OR loan out during the season.

Awards

Football Association of Malaysia National Football Awards

Others

Season Goalscorers

1992
 Azli Mahmood (7 goals)
 Mohd Hashim Mustapha (6 goals)

1990
 Prasert Changmool (7 goals)

Players by season

2006–07

Source:

2002

2001

2000

1999

1998

See also
 Kelantan FA

2017 season

Under-21s

The Kelantan FA U21 team plays in the Piala Presiden and a number of local cup competitions.

Under-19s

The Kelantan FA U19 team plays in the Piala Belia and a number of local cup competitions.

Staff

 U21s Head Coach: Mohd Hashim Mustapha
 U21s Assistant Coach: Zahariman Ghazali
 U21s Manager: Wan Rakemi Wan Zahari
 U21s Assistant Manager: Che Rastum Che Mood
 U21s Physiotherapist: Ahmad Faris Musa 
 U21s Goalkeeping Coach: Mohd Halim Bin Napi
 U21s Security Officer: Normizal Ismail
 U21s Media Officer: Ab Ghainizan Ab Bakar 
 U21s Kitman: Jusoh Jenal
 U21s Team Coordinator: Ghazali Husin

 U19s Head Coach: Sazami Shafi'i
 U19s Assistant Coach: Nik Ahmad Fadly Nik Leh
 U19s Manager: Datuk Seri Amril Aiman Abdul Aziz
 U19s Assistant Manager: Mohamad Danish Aklil Bin Azlan 
 U19s Assistant Manager: Ahmad Faizal Husain 
 U19s Goalkeeping Coach: Mohd Azam Othman 
 U19s Media Officer: Fazuny Mohd Noor
 U19s Kitman: Noor Azmi Mohd Nor 
 U19s Team Coordinator: Ahmad Faizal Husain

References

External links
 Official website 
 1987 records
 1986 records
 3/1998 News
 1998 News
 4/1998 News 4/1998
 1999
 2002
 2002 2
 players

Kelantan FA